The ZF S6-53 is a 6-speed manual transmission manufactured by ZF Friedrichshafen AG.

Applications

Rear-wheel-drive

Gasoline

GS6-53BZ 
BMW 1 Series
 E82 (135i N54 Pre-LCI) 

BMW 2 Series

 M2 (F87) 

BMW 3 Series 
 E90 (335i N54 Pre-LCI/M3) 
 E91 (335i N54 Pre-LCI) 
 E92 (335i N54 Pre-LCI/M3) 
 E93 (335i N54 Pre-LCI/M3)
 M3 (E90/92/93)
 M3 (F80)
 M3 (G80)

BMW 4 Series
 M4 (F82/83)
 M4 (G82/83)

BMW 5 Series 
 E60 (535i N54 Pre-LCI/540i/545i/550i) 
 E61 (545i/550i) 
 F10 (550i/M5) 
 F11 (550i)

BMW 6 Series 
 E63 (645i/650i) 
 E64 (645i/650i)

Gran Coupe 
 F06 (M6) 
 F12 (650i/M6)
 F13 (650i/M6)

BMW Z Series 
 Z4 E89 (sDrive35i)

GS6L40LZ 
BMW Z Series

 Z4 G29 (sDrive20i)

GS6L50TZ 
 Toyota GR Supra (J29/DB)

Diesel

GS6-53DZ 
BMW 1 Series 
 E81/E82/E87/E88 (123d)

BMW 3 Series 
 E46 (330d/330Cd) 
 E90/E91/E92/E93 (325d/330d)

BMW 5 Series 
 E60 (525d/530d) 
 E61 (520d/525d/530d) 
 F10 (530d) 
 F11 (530d)

All-wheel-drive

GS6X53DZ 
BMW 3 Series 
 E46 (330xd) 
 E90/E91/E92 (335xi Pre-LCI N54)

BMW 5 Series 
 E60/E61 (525xd/530xd/535xi)

BMW X Series 
 X3 E83 (3.0d)
 X5 E53 (3.0d)

References

External links 
https://www.bimmerfest.ru/korobka-peredach-gs6-53/

https://www.zf.com/products/en/cars/products_29322.html

S6-53